Grimsby Docks railway station serves the Freeman Street area of Grimsby in North East Lincolnshire, England. This is one of the oldest parts of the town, close to the Freeman Street Market and the town's docks both commercial and fish, the railway entrance to both being over the level crossing at the Cleethorpes end. The docks offices can be seen in the photograph in the distance, in which the line to Cleethorpes swings round to the right. 

The station had miles of sidings for the storage of fish vans to its rear and was double track.

Between 19 September and 2 October 1993, the main line east of Brocklesby Junction was closed to allow for the completion and commissioning of the Grimsby area Resignalling scheme. The double track line east of Grimsby Town was reduced to single and the whole line was resignalled to colour lights operated from Pasture Street signal box. A short passing loop, enough for the present day traffic, is located towards Pasture Street.  Signalling control on the line was transferred to the York Rail Operating Centre in January 2016 and the box at Pasture Street was decommissioned and demolished.

Although the train service through Grimsby Docks has been chiefly passenger trains, a thriving freight service originated from the nearby Fish Docks. Prior to the building of the present Cleethorpes Road bridge, a complex railway junction and level crossing was situated on the Cleethorpes side of Grimsby Docks station. The loss of the fresh fish traffic from rail to road eventually resulted in the removal of the junction. The level crossing,  being on a major route between Grimsby town and Cleethorpes, was the cause for many delays on Cleethorpe Road. In the mid-1960s, it was subsequently removed in favour of a concrete-built road bridge. The bridge itself caused the wholesale demolition of several buildings housing numerous businesses, banks, public houses and a major hotel (run by the parents of actress Patricia Hodge) but by the time of its completion in 1967 the changes in transportation of fish had made both the bridge and the station redundant.

The town's main railway station is Grimsby Town, located in the town centre.

The station has the Plusbus scheme where train and bus tickets can be bought together at a saving: it is in the same area as Grimsby and Cleethorpes stations.

Facilities
The station is unstaffed and has very basic amenities (bench seating, a waiting shelter, timetable poster board and public telephone).  All tickets have to be purchased prior to travel or on the train.  Step-free access is available from the entrance and car park to the platform.

Services
All services at Grimsby Docks are operated by East Midlands Railway using Class 156 DMUs.

There is a Sunday service of four trains per day in each direction during the summer months only. There are no winter Sunday services at the station.

Services were previously operated by Northern Trains but transferred to East Midlands Railway as part of the May 2021 timetable changes.

References

External links 

Railway stations in the Borough of North East Lincolnshire
DfT Category F2 stations
Former Great Central Railway stations
Railway stations in Great Britain opened in 1853
Railway stations served by East Midlands Railway
Former Northern franchise railway stations